Taylor Laurence Handley (born June 1, 1984) is an American actor.

Early years
Handley was born in Santa Barbara, California. He attended Santa Monica City College.

Career 
In 1998, Handley played Rory Buck in the movie Jack Frost. In 2000, Handley starred in the Disney Channel Original Movie, Phantom of the Megaplex. Handley appeared in three episodes during the last season of Dawson's Creek and guest starred during an episode of CSI: Crime Scene Investigation. In 2003 and 2004, Handley appeared as Oliver Trask in six episodes of the first season of The O.C. In 2005, he starred in Zerophilia, a speculative-fiction romantic comedy exploring gender identity. In 2006, Handley appeared in two films: The Standard and The Texas Chainsaw Massacre: The Beginning. Handley's next film, September Dawn, was released to theaters on August 24, 2007.

Also in 2007, Handley starred as Johnny Miller in the short-lived series Hidden Palms, on The CW.

On April 9, 2009, he guest-starred in the pilot of Southland, playing Wade. He returned as Wade in the second episode of the second season.

Handley also co-starred alongside Dennis Quaid in the series Vegas, playing the character Dixon Lamb.

In 2013, he appeared in the commercial "Greatness Awaits" for the PlayStation 4 console, and in 2020 in the State Farm Insurance commercial "Not the One", in which he played a rejected contestant from a Bachelorette-esque program who is comforted by "Jake from State Farm".

Filmography

Film

Television
Phantom of the Megaplex (2000, TV Movie) as Pete Riley
Frasier (2002, Episode: "Juvenilla") as Trent
CSI: Crime Scene Investigation (2002, Episode: "Let the Seller Beware") as Max Newman
Becker (2003, Episode: "Bad to the Bone") as Brad
Dawson's Creek (2003, 3 episodes) as Patrick
Then Came Jones (2003, TV Movie)
The O.C. (2003–2004, 6 episodes) as Oliver Trask
Cold Case (2006, Episode: "One Night") as Steve Jablonski
In from the Night (2006, TV Movie) as Bobby
CSI: Miami (2007, Episode: "Born to Kill") as Travis Peck
Hidden Palms (2007, 8 episodes) as Johnny Miller
Numb3rs (2009, Episode: "Animal Rites") as James Arthur
Southland (2009, 2 episodes) as Wade
The Cleaner (2009, Episode: "The Turtle & The Butterfly") as Travis Nathanson
CSI: NY (2010, Episode: "Damned If You Do") as Billy Travis
The Glades (2011, Episode: "Moonlighting") as Trey Lancer
Law & Order: LA (2011, Episode: "Westwood") as Eric Kentner
Vegas (2012) as Dixon Lamb
APB (2017) as Officer Roderick Brandt
Proven Innocent (2019, Episode: "Cross to Bear") as Ronnie Peterson
Animal Kingdom (2021, 2 episodes) as Liam
Mayor of Kingstown (2021–2022, 10 episodes) as Kyle McLusky

Producer
Sink Into You (2011)

References

External links

1984 births
American male child actors
American male film actors
American male television actors
Living people
Male actors from Santa Barbara, California
20th-century American male actors
21st-century American male actors